Maeva Sarrasin (born 10 June 1987) is a Swiss football forward currently playing in the Nationalliga A for Servette. She has been a member of the Swiss national team. As a junior international she played the 2006 U-19 European Championship.

References

1987 births
Living people
Swiss women's footballers
Women's association football forwards
Servette FC Chênois Féminin players
Swiss Women's Super League players